Antigenes funebris is a species of beetle in the family Cerambycidae from Madagascar, and the only species in the genus Antigenes. It was described by Pascoe in 1888.

References

Dorcasominae
Beetles described in 1888